This is a list of people who attended, or taught at, the University of Wisconsin–Milwaukee, including those who attended Milwaukee State Normal School, Wisconsin State Teacher’s College, Wisconsin State College–Milwaukee and the University of Wisconsin-Extension Center in Milwaukee:

Notable alumni

Academics 

 George R. Blumenthal (B.S. Physics), astrophysicist, the 10th chancellor of University of California, Santa Cruz
 Christopher Bratton (1994 MFA Film), President of School of the Museum of Fine Arts, Boston, former president of the San Francisco Art Institute
 Robert R. Caldwell (1992 Ph.D. Physics), Professor of Physics and Astronomy at Dartmouth College, Fellow of the American Physical Society
 Juan Carlos Campuzano (1978 Ph.D. Physics), fellow of American Physical Society; 2011 Buckley Prize winner; Argonne distinguished fellow; distinguished professor of physics at University of Illinois, Chicago
 Carlos Castillo-Chavez (1977 MS Mathematics), Regents and Joaquin Bustoz Jr. Professor at Arizona State University; fellow of American Mathematical Society
 Alok R. Chaturvedi (1989 Ph.D. MIS), professor of MIS at Purdue University; founder and director of Krannert School of Management SEAS Laboratory
 James Elsner (1988 Ph.D.), Earl and Sophia Shaw Professor of Geography at Florida State University
 Keith Hamm (1977 PhD Political Science), Edwards Professor of Political Science at Rice University
 William D. Haseman (MBA in MIS), Wisconsin Distinguished Professor of MIS at University of Wisconsin–Milwaukee
 James G. Henderson (M.A. Education ), professor of education at Kent State University, creator of 3S Understanding curriculum structure
 Gary Hoover (1993 B.A. economics), Chair of Economics Department at University of Oklahoma
 George L. Kelling (M.S.W.), professor of criminal justice at Rutgers University
 Jack Kilby (1950 M.S. Electronic Engineering ), Nobel Prize Laureate in Physics 2000, inventor of the Integrated Circuit.
 Oded Lowengart (PhD Marketing), professor of marketing at the Ben-Gurion University of the Negev (BGU) in Israel
 Justin Marlowe (2004 PhD Political Science), Endowed Professor of Public Finance and associate dean at University of Washington
 Laura Mersini-Houghton (2000 PhD Physics), theoretical physicist-cosmologist and professor at the University of North Carolina at Chapel Hill
 James Otteson (1992 MA Philosophy), philosopher
 Prakash Panangaden (PhD), fellow of the Royal Society of Canada, founding chair of the Association for Computing Machinery Special Interest Group on Logic and Computation
 Jack Nusan Porter, sociologist, rabbi, and pioneer in genocide studies
 Havidan Rodriguez (1986 MA Sociology), sociologist, 20th president of the University at Albany, SUNY
 Jeanne W. Ross (PhD MIS), organizational theorist and Principal Research Scientist at MIT Sloan School of Management; Director of MIT Sloan School’s Center for Information Systems Research
 Eileen Schwalbach (PhD Urban Education), 11th President of Mount Mary College
 Jean Schwarzbauer (BS Chemistry), Eugene Higgins Professor of Molecular Biology at Princeton University
 Eugenie Scott (BS, MS), physical anthropologist, executive director of the National Center for Science Education
 Robert M. Stein (1977 PhD), Lena Gohlman Fox Professor of Political Science at Rice University, former Dean of Rice University School of Social Sciences
 Jerry Straka (1986 MS Geophysical Sciences), tornado expert
 Ron Tanner (1989 PhD American Literature), professor of writing at Loyola University Maryland, two-term president of the Association of Writers & Writing Programs
 Aaron Twerski (BS Philosophy)(born 1939), the Irwin and Jill Cohen Professor of Law at Brooklyn Law School, as well as a former Dean and professor of tort law at Hofstra University School of Law
 Larry N. Vanderhoef (M.S. Biology), 5th chancellor of University of California, Davis.
 Wayne A. Wiegand (1970 MA History), library historian, author, and academic.
 Ahmed I. Zayed (1979 PhD), mathematician, chair and professor, Department of Mathematical Sciences, DePaul University

Architecture and urban planning
 Will Bruder (BA Fine Art), architect
 Andres Mignucci (1979 BS Arch), FAIA, architect and urbanist, fellow of the American Institute of Architects
 Thomas Vonier (1974, M.Arch.), FAIA, RIBA, Paris-based architect, founding president of the Continental Europe chapter of American Institute of Architects, president of the International Union of Architects

Business 

 Steven Burd (1973 MA Economics), retired president and CEO of Safeway Inc.
 Steven Davis (1980 BA Business), CEO of Bob Evans Restaurants; former president of Long John Silver's and A&W Restaurants
 Roger Fitzsimonds (1960 BA Business, '71 MBA Finance), retired chairman and CEO, Firstar Corp (now U.S. Bank)
 Dennis R. Glass (1971 BA Business, '73 MBA), president and CEO of Lincoln National Corporation
 David Herro (1985 MA Economics), Morningstar International Stock Fund Manager of the Decade, Republican donor
 Albert Beckford Jones (MA), chief advisor to the U.S. Civilian Research & Development Foundation
 Gale E. Klappa (1972 BBA Communication), chairman, president and CEO of Wisconsin Energy Corporation
 Dennis J. Kuester (1966 BBA), former chairman and CEO of Marshall & Ilsley Corporation; member of the Federal Reserve Advisory Council
 William H. Lacy Jr. (1968, BBA), former president and chief executive officer, MGIC Investment Corp.
 Satya Nadella (1990 MS Computer Science), CEO of Microsoft
 Keith Nosbusch (MBA), president and CEO of Rockwell Automation, formerly Rockwell International
 Richard Notebaert (1983, MBA), former chairman and CEO, Qwest Communications International, Inc., and Ameritech
 Jack F. Reichert (1957), former president of Brunswick Corp.
 Deven Sharma (1980 MS, Industrial Engineering), former executive and president of Standard & Poor's
 James L. Ziemer (1975 BBA, 1986 EMBA), former president and CEO of Harley-Davidson, Inc.
 Edward J. Zore (1968 BS Economics, 1970 MS Economics), president and CEO of Northwestern Mutual

Fine arts and pop culture

Film, television and performing arts
 Pamela Britton, Broadway, film and television actress (D.O.A.; My Favorite Martian)
 Frank Caliendo (1996 BA, Mass Communication-Broadcast Journalism), comedian
 Willem Dafoe (1974), actor
 Angna Enters, dancer, mime, painter, writer, novelist and playwright
 Jed Allen Harris (1974 BFA), stage director
 Tom Hewitt (1981 Professional Theatre Training Program), Broadway performer; 2001 Tony Award nominee for best actor in Rocky Horror Show
 Scott Jaeck (1977 BS, Architecture), television and stage actor
 Trixie Mattel (2012 BFA, Music, Inter-Arts), drag queen, singer-songwriter, comedian and television personality
 Jim Rygiel (1977 BFA, Painting and Drawing), Oscar winner of digital effects for Lord of the Rings
 Tina Salaks, author, former ASPCA officer, star of Animal Precinct on Animal Planet
 Bryan W. Simon (1979 BA, Political Science), film and stage director
 Chris M. Smith (1999 MFA, Film), filmmaker and founder of Bluemark Production and ZeroTV.com
 Ray Szmanda, television personality

Music
 Naima Adedapo (2007 BFA, Dance), American Idol finalist
 Victor DeLorenzo, drummer for Violent Femmes
 Herschel Burke Gilbert, (1939) composer of film and television theme songs
 Frederick Hemke (1961 BS, Music Education), saxophonist
 Guy Hoffman (1978 BFA, Art), drummer and vocalist, former Violent Femmes and BoDeans member
 Andy Hurley (2014 BA, Committee Interdiciplinary), drummer for Fall Out Boy
 Jerome Kitzke (1978 BFA, Music), composer
 Willie Pickens (1958 BS Music Education), jazz pianist, composer, arranger, and educator
 Jessica Suchy-Pilalis, harpist, Byzantine singer and composer
 Warren Wiegratz (1968 BBA), saxophonist, leader of the band Streetlife

Visual arts 
 Ruth Asawa (1998 BFA, Art Education), Japanese American sculptor, a driving force behind the creation of Ruth Asawa San Francisco School of the Arts
 Thomasita Fessler (1935 BA), painter
 Michelle Grabner (1984 BFA Art, 1987 MA Art History), painter
 Hanna Jubran (1980 BFA Art, 1983 MFA Sculpture),  sculptor
 Denis Kitchen (1968 BS, Mass Communications-Journalism), underground comics artist, publisher, author, founder of the Comic Book Legal Defense Fund
 Dennis Kois (1995, BA), museum designer (Metropolitan Museum of Art, Smithsonian); Director, DeCordova Museum and Sculpture Park, Boston, MA
 David Lenz (1963 BA, Spanish), painter
 Jan Serr (1968 MFA, Art), visual artist
 Roy Staab (1968 BFA, Art), artist
 Donald George Vogl (1958 MS, Art Education), artist, retired professor of art at University of Notre Dame

Journalism and public media
 Maureen Bunyan, television journalist, lead co-anchor at WJLA-TV
 Milton Coleman (1968 BFA), deputy managing editor of The Washington Post, president of Inter American Press Association; former president of American Society of News Editors
 Dorothy Fuldheim, journalist and anchor, "First Lady of Television News"
 John K. Iglehart (1961 Journalism), founding editor of Health Affairs
 Derrick Zane Jackson, opinion columnist/associate editor for the Boston Globe
 Marc Jampole, public relations executive; former television news reporter
 Ross A. Lewis (1923), Pulitzer Prize-winning editorial cartoonist
 Jim Ott, WTMJ-TV meteorologist; Wisconsin state representative
 Scott Shuster (B.A. in Mass Communication), broadcast journalist
 Peter James Spielmann (BA, Journalism), international desk editor for Associated Press; professor of journalism at Columbia
 Raquel Rutledge (1990 Journalism), Pulitzer Prize-winning journalist
 Terry Zahn, television reporter and anchorman
 Ben Kissle, Host of Last Podcast On The Left

Literature 
 Antler (1970 BA, Anthropology), poet
 Emily Ballou, Australian-American poet, novelist and screenwriter
 Sandra Tabatha Cicero, author
 José Dalisay, Jr. (1988 Ph.D English), writer, poet, playwright
 John Gurda (1978 MA Cultural Geography), writer and narrator of The Making of Milwaukee; eight-time winner of the Wisconsin Historical Society’s Award of Merit
 Ellen Hunnicutt, writer, Drue Heinz Literature Prize winner
 Adrienne L. Kaeppler, anthropologist, curator of Oceanic Ethnology at the National Museum of Natural History at the Smithsonian Institution
 Caroline Knox, poet
 Marie Kohler (1979 MA English Literature), writer and playwright; member of the Kohler family of Wisconsin
 James Lowder (1999, MA Literary Studies), author and editor
 Mary Rose O'Reilley, poet, Walt Whitman Award recipient
 Lynne Rae Perkins (1991 MA), Newbery Award-winning writer
 Virginia Satir (1936 BA Education), author and psychotherapist
 Gordon Weaver, novelist and short-story writer, O. Henry Award recipient

Politics and government
 Luis E. Arreaga, U.S. Ambassador to Iceland, U.S. Ambassador to Guatemala
 Peter W. Barca, U.S. Congressman and Wisconsin State Representative from Kenosha
 Jeannette Bell, Wisconsin State Representative, mayor of West Allis, Wisconsin
 Tim Carpenter, Wisconsin State Senator from Milwaukee
 Spencer Coggs, (1976 BS Community Education), Wisconsin State Senator, 2003–2013; Treasurer of the City of Milwaukee
 Dennis Conta, politician and consultant, Secretary of the Wisconsin Department of Revenue
 Alberta Darling, Wisconsin State Representative 1990-92, Wisconsin State Senator, 1992–present from River Hills
 John E. Douglas, former special agent of U.S. Federal Bureau of Investigation (FBI), one of the first criminal profilers, and criminal psychology author
 Alberto Fujimori, (1972 MS Mathematics), President of Peru, 1990–2000
 Eric Genrich, Mayor of Green Bay, Wisconsin State Representative
 Randall Gnant, (1967 BS History and Political Science), Arizona State Senate, 1995–2003; Senate President 2001–2003
 Richard Grobschmidt, Wisconsin State Senate (1995–2003); Wisconsin State Assembly (1985–1995)
 Jeff Halper (Ph.D. in Cultural and Applied Anthropology), anthropologist, political activist, co-founder and director of the Israeli Committee Against House Demolitions
 Mildred Harnack, German resistance fighter during World War II, executed under order from Adolf Hitler
 Nikiya Harris Dodd, Wisconsin State Senator from Milwaukee
 Zuhdi Jasser, President and founder of American Islamic Forum for Democracy
 Jerry Kleczka, U.S. Congressman 1984–2005
 Chris Larson, Wisconsin State Senator from Milwaukee
 Mary Lazich, President of the Wisconsin State Senate
 Henry Maier (1964 MA Political Science), Milwaukee mayor 1960–1988
 Golda Meir (1917, Education), fourth Prime Minister of Israel; one of the signers of the Declaration of Independence of the State of Israel
 Robert J. Modrzejewski (1957 BS Education), U.S. Marine Colonel (retired), Medal of Honor from President Lyndon B. Johnson in 1968
 Paa Kwesi Nduom, former Minister for Economic Planning & Regional Cooperation, Energy, and Public Sector Reform of Republic of Ghana
 Jim Ott, Wisconsin State Representative from Mequon
 Rudolph T. Randa, Article III federal judge in the United States District Court for the Eastern District of Wisconsin.
 Jim Risch, U.S. Senator from Idaho
 Margaret A. Rykowski, U.S. Navy admiral
 Karen Sasahara, U.S. ambassadors to Jordan, Consul General in Jerusalem
 Dawn Marie Sass, Treasurer of Wisconsin 2007–2011
 Brad Schimel (1987 BA Political Science), the 44th Wisconsin Attorney General
 Martin E. Schreiber, assemblyman and Milwaukee alderman, father of Martin J. Schreiber
 Martin J. Schreiber (1960, 3+3 Program), 38th Lieutenant Governor of Wisconsin and 39th Governor of Wisconsin
Steve Sisolak (1974, BS Business), 30th Governor of Nevada
 Lawrence H. Smith, congressman from Racine
 Jim Steineke, Wisconsin State Representative from Kaukauna
 Lena Taylor (1990, English), Wisconsin state senator; elected to Assembly in April 2003 special election; elected to Senate 2004
 Wayne F. Whittow, Wisconsin senator, City Treasurer of Milwaukee
 Brian E. Winski，United States Army Major general, commander of the 101st Airborne Division

Science and technology 
 Michael Dhuey, electrical and computer engineer, co-inventor of the Macintosh II and the iPod
 Luther Graef (1961 MS Structural Engineering), Founder of Graef Anhalt Schloemer & Associates Inc. and former president of American Society of Civil Engineers
 Justin Jacobs (2005 MS Mathematics), recipient of Presidential Early Career Award for Scientists and Engineers
 Phil Katz (1984, BS Computer Science), computer programmer known as the author of PKZIP
 Jack Kilby (1950 MS Electrical Engineering), engineer
 Satya Nadella (MS Computer Science), CEO of Microsoft
 Gustavo R. Paz-Pujalt (1985 PhD Physical Chemistry), scientist and inventor
 Cheng Xu (1997 Ph.D Turbomachinery), aerodynamic design engineer, American Society of Mechanical Engineers fellow
 Scott Yanoff (1993 BS Computer Science), Internet pioneer

Sports

Athletes
 Christine Boskoff, world-class mountaineer, reached more record summits than any other female in history
 Tighe Dombrowski, MLS soccer player
 Ricky Franklin, American basketball player 
 Don Gramenz, Minnesota Thunder defender
 Sarah Hagen, American footballer of FC Kansas City United States women's national soccer team
 Demetrius Harris, NFL football player, tight end of Kansas City Chiefs
 Chris Hill, Spirou Basket Charleroi basketball player
 P. J. Johns, soccer goalkeeper, member of the United States national futsal team 
 Ken Kranz, NFL football player
 Alan Kulwicki (1977 BS Mechanical Engineering), 1992 NASCAR Winston Cup champion, was named one of NASCAR's 50 Greatest Drivers and was inducted into the International Motorsports Hall of Fame

 Manny Lagos, MLS soccer player; U.S. Olympian
 Greg Mahlberg, MLB baseball player
 Paul Meyers, professional football player
 Clem Neacy, NFL football player
 Dylan Page, Chorale Roanne Basket basketball player in France
 Allison Pottinger (MBA Marketing), curler; 2003 gold medalist and 2006 silver medalist at the World Curling Championships
 Mike Reinfeldt (1975 BA Business), NFL All-Pro defensive back, General Manager of Tennessee Titans, former Seattle Seahawks Chief Financial Officer
 Tony Sanneh, MLS soccer player; United States men's national soccer team and U.S. World Cup team member
 George H. Sutton, professional billiard player, the "handless billiard player"
 Clay Tucker basketball player
 Joventut Badalona basketball player
 Daulton Varsho MLB baseball player
 Mitchell Whitmore, speed skater
 Whitey Wolter, NFL football player

Coaches and referees
 Jimmy Banks (1987 Education), Milwaukee School of Engineering men's soccer team head coach
 Bill Carollo (1974 BBA Industrial Relations), NFL referee
 Sasho Cirovski (1985 BBA, 1989 MBA), University of Maryland men's soccer team head coach
 Warren Giese, South Carolina Gamecocks football head coach
 Jeff Rohrman, UW–Madison men's soccer team head coach
 Bruce Weber (1978 BA Education), Kansas State University men's basketball head coach

Others
 Lynde Bradley Uihlein (MS Social Welfare), philanthropist
 Clara Stanton Jones, the first African-American president of the American Library Association and the first African-American director of a major city public library in the United States
 Patricia Wells (BA Journalism), cookbook author

Notable faculty 
 Bruce Allen, physicist and professor, fellow of American Physical Society and fellow of Institute of Physics (UK)
 David Backes, author; professor in journalism, advertising, and media studies
 Anne Basting, professor of theater and expert on aging, dementia and the arts; 2016 MacArthur Fellowship winner
 Robert J. Beck, scholar of international law
 Sandra Braman, former professor of communication (no longer at UW-M)
 Y. Austin Chang, former professor and department chair of material engineering; elected member of the National Academy of Engineering; elected foreign member of the Chinese Academy of Sciences; fellow of The Minerals, Metals & Materials Society; fellow of ASM International
 Francis D.K. Ching, professor of architecture, known for architectural and design graphics
 Cecelia Condit, video artist, professor in film, video, animation and new genres
 Melvyn Dubofsky, professor of history and sociology
 Rebecca Dunham, poet, professor of English
 Hugo O. Engelmann, sociologist, anthropologist and general systems theorist
 Millicent (Penny) Ficken, – ornithologist who specialized in birds' vocalizations and their social behaviors
 Louis Fortis, economist; state legislator; newspaper editor and publisher
 Jane Gallop, writer, University distinguished professor
 Al Ghorbanpoor, civil engineer and professor, fellow of the American Society of Civil Engineers
 Robert G. Greenler, physicist, former president of Optical Society of America in 1987
 Martin Haberman, educator, University distinguished professor
 John Brian Harley, professor of geography
 William D. Haseman, Wisconsin Distinguished Professor of Business
 Ihab Hassan, Vilas Research Professor of English and comparative literature
 Thomas Hubka, professor of architecture
 Richard Klein, paleoanthropologist
 Mark L. Knapp, professor of communication
 John Koethe, professor of philosophy, poet and essayist
 Markos Mamalakis, economist and professor
 Christina Maranci, former associate professor, expert on the history and development of Armenian architecture
 Kenneth J. Meier, political scientist
 Jim Moody, federal government economist 1967-1969, US Congressman 1979-1982, former associate professor of economics
 Marjorie "Mo" Mowlam Associate Professor of Political Science, later Labour Member of the British Parliament and Secretary of State for Northern Ireland
 Satish Nambisan, professor of entrepreneurship & technology management, Sheldon B. Lubar School of Business; professor of industrial & manufacturing engineering, College of Engineering & Applied Science; author, The Global Brain.
 Harold L. Nieburg, political scientist
 Leonard Parker, physicist and professor, fellow of American Physical Society
 Brett Peters, industrial engineer, fellow of the Institute of Industrial Engineers, dean of the College of Engineering and Applied Science
 Stephen Pevnick, inventor of Graphical Waterfall, professor of art
 Amos Rapoport, University Distinguished Professor of Architecture
 Pradeep Rohatgi, Wisconsin Distinguished Professor of Engineering
 Herbert H. Rowen, historian of Early Modern Europe
 Richard P. Smiraglia, knowledge organization
 Leonard Sorkin, violinist
 William H. Starbuck, organizational scientist
 Anastasios Tsonis, distinguished professor of mathematical science
 Hiroomi Umezawa, physicist and former Distinguished Professor at the Department of Physics
 Harriet Werley, professor of nursing; charter fellow and a Living Legend of the American Academy of Nursing; fellow of the American College of Medical Informatics; founding editor of Research in Nursing and Health; co-creator of the Nursing Minimum Data Set

University chancellors 
 Mark Mone (2014–present)
 Michael Lovell (2010–2014)
 Carlos E. Santiago (2004–2010)
 Nancy L. Zimpher (1998–2003)
 John H. Schroeder (1991–1998)
 Clifford V. Smith, Jr. (1985–1990)
 Frank E. Horton (1980–1985)
 Werner A. Baum (1973–1979)
 J. Martin Klotsche (1956–1973)

References

University of Wisconsin-Milwaukee people
 
University of Wisconsin–Milwaukee